LS (stands for “Liniový Systém” in Czech, “continuous system” in English) is a cab signalling and a train protection system used on the main lines of the Czech and Slovak railways (on all lines which track speed exceeds 100 km/h in the Czech republic or 120 km/h in Slovakia). This system continuously transmits and shows a signal aspect of the next main signal in driver's cabin and when the driver's activity is needed (e.g. a speed reduction), it periodically checks the driver's vigilance (he has to press the “vigilance” button; else the emergency brake is applied). This is the main function of on-board part of the LS-system (continuous cab signalling and checking the driver's vigilance when needed).

Trackside part of the LS-system is based on coded track circuits using carrier frequency 75 Hz with 100% amplitude modulation (on-off keying). The signal aspect of the next signal is coded in modulation frequency (there are used four modulation frequencies: 0.9 Hz – 1.8 Hz – 3.6 Hz – 5.4 Hz; it means that it is possible to transmit four signal aspects).

The LS-system can transmit these signal aspects:

 Red aspect – train must stop at the next signal.
 Aspect requiring decreasing of train's speed – train must reduce its speed at the next signal to the value shown at the lineside signal.
 Yellow aspect – there are no speed restrictions at the next signal, but the subsequent signal is red.
 Green aspect – there are no speed restrictions at the next signal.

The trackside part of the LS-system became an integral part of every Automatic Block used on the lines in the Czech Republic and in Slovakia. Almost the entire fleet of locomotives is equipped with the on-board part of the LS-system (in one of these versions: LS II–IV, LS 90, LS 06 or MIREL VZ1).

Mirel VZ1

The on-board device Mirel VZ1, unlike older devices, generates a braking curve according to a received restrictive signal. Nevertheless, the trackside part of the LS-system offers too little information to generate a usable braking curve. Thus, this braking curve is so restrictive that its use is questionable. The driver has two choices then. He has to regulate the speed so that it is lower than the generated speed, otherwise emergency braking is applied; or he can use manual mode and there is no braking curve (only checking the driver's vigilance). However, the Mirel VZ1 has an optional ability to decode the Hungarian signals of the EVM 120. Therefore, the newest Škoda locomotive 380/381 (they will be operated also in Hungary) were equipped with Mirel VZ1 instead of LS90 board unit.

Railway signaling in the Czech Republic
Railway signaling in Slovakia
Train protection systems